Vasyl Kuybida (born May 8, 1958 in Inta, Komi ASSR) is a Ukrainian politician, scientist, son of veterans of the Ukrainian Insurgent Army (both father and mother) who were exiled to the Russian North. He is known for heading the People's Movement of Ukraine and being elected mayor of the Lviv city. Merited Jurist of Ukraine.

Biography
He has been elected to the Verhovna Rada two times (in 2006 and 2007). In 1994-2002 Kuybida was a mayor of the Lviv city, in 2007-10 - Minister of Regional Development and Construction. Initiator and coauthor of the UNESCO program Lviv - Historic Center. Since 2012 Kuybida was elected the leader of People's Movement of Ukraine.

In the 2014 Ukrainian presidential election Kuybida received 0.06% of the vote. He described his top priorities as "further strengthening and development of the democratic roots of Ukrainian national statehood; implementing the ideas of democracy, pluralism, social solidarity, and open society, rebuilding the national economy on the principles of a freely competitive market system, facilitating the development of private entrepreneurship, systemic agrarian reform, ensuring social security for every citizen, social assistance for those in need, pension reform, the cultural revival of Ukrainian society, of the Ukrainian people's national identity, of the Ukrainian language in all spheres of public life, and integration into the EU and NATO as a vital cornerstone of Ukraine's foreign policy."

See also
 List of mayors of Lviv

References

External links
 Who-is-Who. Vasyl Kuybida
 Liga profile. Vasyl Kuybida
 Vasyl Kuybida: Refor of local self-government in Ukraine - view from the center
 Vasyl Kuybida: Galician contrasts 
 Ukrainian parliament of the 5th convocation
 Ukrainian parliament of the 6th convocation

1958 births
Living people
People's Movement of Ukraine politicians
Fifth convocation members of the Verkhovna Rada
Sixth convocation members of the Verkhovna Rada
Regional development and construction ministers of Ukraine
Candidates in the 2014 Ukrainian presidential election
People from Inta
Russian people of Ukrainian descent
Russian emigrants to Ukraine
Mayors of Lviv
Recipients of the Order of Danylo Halytsky
Recipients of the Honorary Diploma of the Cabinet of Ministers of Ukraine